The Copa América is South America's major tournament in senior men's football and determines the continental champion. Until 1967, the tournament was known as South American Championship. It is the oldest continental championship in the world with its first edition held in 1916.

Brazil have won the tournament nine times, which makes them the third-most successful team in tournament history behind Argentina and Uruguay (15 each).

Brazil withdrew from Copa America for almost ten years between 1926 and 1935.

They were particularly successful from 1997 to 2007, winning four out of five Copas during that time. Zizinho, who competed in the 1940s and 1950s, is both the player with the most matches (34) and the most goals (17) in tournament history, though he shares both records. After winning the 2019 Copa América, Brazil were the defending champions before losing the 2021 final to Argentina.

Pelé, the "Player of the Century", has never won the continental title and only competed in one South American Championship in 1959. However, he did present his impressive scoring abilities with eight goals in six matches, becoming that edition's top scorer and most valuable player.

Overall record

Winning finals

In the era of the South American Championship, Round Robins were more commonly played than knock-out tournaments. Listed are the decisive matches which secured Brazil the respective titles.

Record by opponent

Brazil's highest victories at continental championships were a 10–1 win against Bolivia in 1949 and a 9–0 win against Colombia in 1957 with Evaristo scoring five goals. Their highest defeat was a 0–6 loss against Uruguay in 1920.

In their first seven matches against Venezuela, Brazil always scored a different amount of goals (0, 2, 3, 4, 5, 6, 7).

Record players

Top goalscorers

Players with multiple titles

In spite of Brazil winning four Copa Américas within ten years from 1997-2007, no single player has been part of more than two victorious squads. Twenty-three players, however, have won two tournaments each:

* Additionally, Dunga won the title as head coach in 2007. Another Brazilian with two titles is Danilo Alvim, who won the South American Championship as player (1949) and as head coach of Bolivia (1963).

Awards and records

Team awards
 Winners (9): 1919, 1922, 1949, 1989, 1997, 1999, 2004, 2007, 2019
 Runners-up (12): 1921, 1925, 1937, 1945, 1946, 1953, 1957, 1959 (Argentina), 1983, 1991, 1995, 2021
 Third place (7): 1916, 1917, 1920, 1942, 1959 (Ecuador), 1975, 1979

Individual awards
 MVP 1919: Arthur Friedenreich
 MVP 1922: Agostinho Fortes
 MVP 1945: Domingos da Guia
 MVP 1949: Ademir
 MVP 1959 (ARG): Pelé
 MVP 1997: Ronaldo
 MVP 1999: Rivaldo
 MVP 2004: Adriano
 MVP 2007: Robinho
MVP 2019: Dani Alves
 Top scorer 1919: Arthur Friedenreich+Neco (4 goals) (shared)
 Top scorer 1945: Heleno (6 goals) (shared)
 Top scorer 1949: Jair (9 goals)
 Top scorer 1959 (ARG): Pelé (8 goals)
 Top scorer 1983: Roberto Dinamite (3 goals) (shared)
 Top scorer 1989: Bebeto (6 goals)
 Top scorer 1999: Rivaldo + Ronaldo (5 goals) (shared)
 Top scorer 2004: Adriano (7 goals)
 Top scorer 2007: Robinho (6 goals)
Top scorer 2019: Everton (3 goals) (shared)
Best goalkeeper 2019: Alisson
 Champion as coach of another nation: Danilo Alvim (with Bolivia 1963)

Team records

 Most goals in one tournament (46, in 1949)
 Victory with highest amount of goals conceded (6–4 v Chile in 1937, tied with Chile 5–4 Peru in 1955 and Bolivia 5–4 Brazil in 1963)
 Only team to simultaneously hold the Copa América and the FIFA World Cup title (1997-1998 and 2004-2006. During both spells they additionally won the FIFA Confederations Cup.)

Individual records

 Most matches: Zizinho (34, shared with Sergio Livingstone)
 Most goals: Zizinho (17, shared with Norberto Méndez)
 Goals at most different tournaments: Zizinho (6, 1942-1957)
 Most goals in one tournament: Jair (9 in 1949, shared with Javier Ambrois and Humberto Maschio, both in 1957)
 Latest goal: Arthur Friedenreich (122', 1919 v Uruguay)

References

External links
RSSSF archives and results
Soccerway database

 
Countries at the Copa América
History of the Brazil national football team